Valgus Koordis (Light in Koordi) is a 1951 Soviet-Estonian drama film directed by Herbert Rappaport and based on the 1949 novel of the same name by Hans Leberecht.

Awards, nominations, participations:
 1952: Stalin Prize (USSR), recipients: Herbert Rappaport, Georg Ots, Aleksander Randviir, Valentine Tern, Elmar Kivilo, Evi Rauer, Hugo Laur, Sergei Ivanov

Plot

Cast
Georg Ots as Paul Runge
Aleksander Randviir as Vao
Valentine Tern as Aino
Ilmar Tammur as Muuli
Rudolf Nuude as Maasalu
Olev Tinn as Taaksalu
Elmar Kivilo as Semidor
Evi Rauer as Roosi
Hugo Laur as Saamu
Johannes Kaljola as Priidu
Franz Malmsten as Janson
Lembit Rajala as Kurvest
Arnold Kasuk as Kamar
Ants Eskola as Känd

References

External links
 
 Valgus Koordis, entry in Estonian Film Database (EFIS)

1951 films
Estonian drama films
Estonian-language films